Robert Luthardt (March 3, 1917 – October 1, 1977) was an American art director. He was nominated for an Academy Award in the category Best Art Direction for The Fortune Cookie.

Selected filmography
 The Fortune Cookie (1966)

References

External links

American art directors
1917 births
1977 deaths